Yewande "Andi" Osho (born 27 January 1973) is a British stand-up comedian, actress and television presenter.

Life and career 
Osho was born in Plaistow, East London, to Nigerian parents. 

After working in television production, Osho turned to acting in 2003. By 2006, she decided to go into stand-up comedy. Osho spent a number of years working as a receptionist by day, while improving her stand-up comedy routines in the evenings.

In 2006, Osho starred as Alma in American playwright Dael Orlandersmith's drama Yellowman at Liverpool's Everyman Theatre. Other theatre work includes a performance in the title role of Medea (Barons Court Theatre, 2005), Amanda in Cigarettes, Coffee and Paranoia (King's Head Theatre, 2005) and Zimbabwean exile Faith in the devised piece Qabuka (Oval House Theatre, 2005).

Osho's television roles include Lin Colvin in Casualty, Adeola Brooker in Doctors, Dr Rogers in Footballers' Wives: Extra Time and Angela Parker in Sea of Souls. She has also appeared in Waking the Dead, EastEnders, Comedy Central's @midnight, Night and Day, Kiri, and Russell Brand and Friends for Channel 4. In 2020 she appeared in Death in Paradise.

Osho is also a playwright and one of the founding members of the London writers' group, Vowel Movement. She has contributed to News Review at London's Canal Cafe Theatre and in 2008, she co-devised a scratch performance of the stage play  Up the Café de Paris for the Pulse Fringe Festival. In 2007, Osho wrote the comedy CSI: Nigeria, in production for BBC Three.

Osho has performed at various comedy clubs and festivals across Britain, including Jongleurs, the Comedy Store, the Reading Festival, the Pleasance Dome, the Chuckle Club, the Leicester Festival (Summer Sundae), the Comedy Café, the Shoreditch Comedy Festival, Comedy Camp and the Hackney Empire.

Osho won the 2007 Nivea Funny Women award.

Osho co-hosted Tonightly on Channel 4 and appeared in an E4 pilot, The Andi O Show. She has also appeared on Mock the Week, Ask Rhod Gilbert, and is a regular performer on Stand Up for the Week.

On 26 February 2011, Osho participated in Let's Dance for Comic Relief, performing a dance routine to Michael Jackson's "Bad". Despite positive comments from the judges, she did not progress to the final round after a public vote.

Osho has won two episodes of Celebrity Mastermind. In 2011, she won the Comic Relief episode with The Matrix trilogy as her specialist subject and then in 2012, she took part in a regular episode choosing host John Humphrys as her specialist subject. Osho also takes an occasional presenting role for the comedy club section on BBC Radio 4 Extra.

On 19 June 2012, Osho made her debut in BBC television medical drama Holby City as medical student Barbara Alcock for three episodes. In July 2014, she appeared in Finding Carter as Susan Sherman. Between 2016 and 2018 she presented Supershoppers with Anna Richardson on Channel 4, being replaced with Sabrina Grant. She took part and won £7,000 for charity in a celebrity edition of The Chase on ITV.

Osho appears in David F. Sandberg's Lights Out and Shazam! as the same character, a social worker named Emma Glover.

In 2021, Osho appeared in the sixth series of the police procedural drama series Line of Duty as journalist and investigative reporter Gail Vella, a murder victim whose case is supervised by DCI Joanne Davidson (Kelly Macdonald).

Osho's debut novel, Asking for a Friend, was first published in 2021.

Filmography

Film

Television

Awards and nominations

References

External links 
Official website

Living people
1973 births
Alumni of the Academy Drama School
Black British actresses
Black British women comedians
Black British television personalities
English dramatists and playwrights
English soap opera actresses
English stage actresses
People from Plaistow, Newham
English people of Yoruba descent
21st-century English actresses